Boris Viktorovich Savinkov (31 January 1879 – 7 May 1925) was a Russian Empire writer and revolutionary. As one of the leaders of the Fighting Organisation, the paramilitary wing of the Socialist Revolutionary Party, Savinkov was involved in the assassinations of several high-ranking imperial officials in 1904 and 1905.

After the February Revolution of 1917, he became Assistant Minister of War (in office from July to August 1917) in the Provisional Government. After the October Revolution of the same year he organized armed resistance against the ruling Bolsheviks. 

In 1921 he wrote, "The Russian people do not want Lenin, Trotsky and Dzerzhinsky, not merely because the Bolsheviks mobilize them, shoot them, take their grain and are ruining Russia.  The Russian people do not want them for the simple reason that .... nobody elected them."

Savinkov emigrated from Soviet Russia in 1920, but in 1924 the OGPU lured him back to the Soviet Union and arrested him. He was either killed in prison or committed suicide.

Young years
Savinkov was born in Kharkov (Kharkiv), the son of a judge in Warsaw. In 1897 he entered the law department of St. Petersburg University but was expelled in 1899 because of participation in students' riots. Later he studied in Berlin and Heidelberg. From 1898 he was a member of various socialist organizations. In 1901 he was arrested and sent to exile to Vologda. He served the exile with some prominent Russian intellectuals including Nikolai Berdyaev and Anatoly Lunacharsky. However, he became disappointed with Marxism and shifted to terrorism. In 1903 Savinkov escaped abroad and joined the Socialist Revolutionary Party, where he soon became Deputy Head of its Combat Organization under Yevno Azef.

Socialist Revolutionary Party
In 1906, he was arrested and sentenced to death for his assassination of Vyacheslav von Plehve, the Russian Minister of Interior, and for participation in the bombing death of Grand Duke Sergei Alexandrovich of Russia. However, he escaped from his prison cell in Odessa - reportedly because a warden agreed to exchange clothes with him, and he walked out, unchallenged, while the warden was arrested and hanged. He left the Russian Empire to avoid recapture. When Azef was exposed as a mole for the Okhrana in 1908, Savinkov was promoted to leader of the SR Fighting Organization, which by now was no longer strong enough to conduct any serious operations. While in France Savinkov volunteered in the French Army during World War I. In April 1917, several months after the February Revolution, he returned to Russia, and in July became Deputy War Minister under Alexander Kerensky. On 30 August, however, he resigned from his post and was expelled from the Socialist Revolutionary Party due to his role in the attempted coup by Prime Minister Kerensky and General Lavr Kornilov.

Civil war 
Savinkov remained in Russia after the October revolution and organised a new counter-revolutionary organisation called the Union for the Defense of the Motherland and Freedom, whose headquarters were at 4 Molochny Alley in Moscow, where his deputy Dr. Grigoriev maintained a medical establishment as a façade.

Savinkov, a leader of the Union for the Defense of the Motherland and Freedom, managed the organisation of several armed uprisings against the Bolsheviks, the most notable being in Yaroslavl, Rybinsk, and Murom in July 1918. Savinkov returned to France after these uprisings were crushed by the Red Army. There, he held various posts in the Russian emigre societies and was Admiral Aleksandr Kolchak's primary representative in Paris. During the Polish-Soviet War of 1919–1920, he moved to Poland, where he formed a Russian political organisation responsible for the formation of several infantry divisions and cavalry units out of the former Red Army PoWs. Together with Merezhkovsky, he published in Warsaw a newspaper entitled "For Freedom!".

Once the Polish-Soviet War concluded in October 1921, Polish authorities sent Savinkov out of the country in order not to cause further friction with the Soviets.

Trust Operation and death

He was an acquaintance of Sidney Reilly, the legendary renegade British agent, and was involved in a number of counter-revolutionary plots against the Bolsheviks, sometimes collaborating with the British Secret Intelligence Service (SIS). These efforts were effectively undermined by the Trust Operation implemented by the Soviet security agency OGPU. Savinkov was lured into the USSR to meet with false conspirators and was consequently arrested. The USSR Supreme Court sentenced him to death but the Presidium of VTsIK converted the sentence to 10 years imprisonment. During his trial, Savinkov declared that he recognized the Bolsheviks and assumed his defeat. While imprisoned, he wrote satirical stories about white émigrés and was allowed to see them published in Moscow. According to the NKVD, he committed suicide by jumping from a window in the Lubyanka prison, in Moscow. However, according to modern publications by Aleksandr Solzhenitsyn and others, Savinkov was killed in prison by OGPU officers. Semyon Ignatyev wrote at the time of the Doctors' Plot that Stalin complained that the MGB was too humane in its interrogation of prisoners exclaiming, "Do you want to be more humanistic than Lenin, who ordered Dzerzhinsky to throw Savinkov out a window?" (Lenin had been already dead for several months by the time Savinkov returned to Russia.)

Legacy
Boris Savinkov wrote several books. His most famous are two autobiographies: Memoirs of a Terrorist, and the loosely autobiographical novel The Pale Horse. Savinkov's works raised huge controversy among SRs, with many of them disclaimed as "spoofs" on terrorism.

Personality 
Ilya Ehrenburg, who met Savinkov in Paris in 1916, wrote that: "Never before had I met so incomprehensible and frightening a man. His face was startling because of his Mongolian cheekbones and his eyes, now sad, now extremely cruel; he often closed them, and his lids were heavy ... In reality, Savinkov no longer believed in anything. Once he told me that it was the Azef affair that broke him. Up to the very end he had believed the agent provocateur to be a hero ... Savinkov turned to writing mediocre novels revealing the inner emptiness of a terrorist who has lost faith in his cause."

In popular culture

Films
 Karen Shakhnazarov directed a 2004 film entitled The Rider Named Death based on Savinkov's autobiographical fiction, The Pale Horse.

Television
 Savinkov was played by Clive Merrison in the 1983 BBC miniseries Reilly: Ace of Spies.

Works
The Pale Horse (novel), 1909 (English edition 1919, online),  (Kon' blednyj) - published under the pseudonym "V. Ropshin"
What Never Happened: A Novel of The Revolution, 1912 (English edition 1917, online),  (To, chego ne bylo) - published under the pseudonym "V. Ropshin"
Memoirs of a Terrorist, 1917 (English edition 1931),  (Vospominanija terrorista)
The Black Horse (novel), 1924 (Russian edition 1923),  (Kon' voronoj)
"Boris Savinkov's Letter to Felix Dzerzhinsky", in The Russian Review, Vol. 29, No. 3 (July 1970), pp. 325–327

Further reading
 Alexandrov, Vladimir. To Break Russia's Chains: Boris Savinkov and His Wars Against the Tsar and the Bolsheviks, Pegasus Books, 2021.
 Spence, Richard B. Boris Savinkov: Renegade on the Left, Columbia University Press, 1991.
 Wędziagolski, Karol. Boris Savinkov: Portrait of a Terrorist, Kingston Press, 1988.

See also
 SR Combat Organization
 Yevno Azef
 Sidney Reilly

References

External links
 Archive of Boris Viktorovič Savinkov Papers at the International Institute of Social History
 Visions of Terror:  Boris Viktorovich Savinkov (1879-1925)
 
 

1879 births
1925 deaths
Writers from Kharkiv
Politicians from Kharkiv
People from Kharkovsky Uyezd
Socialist Revolutionary Party politicians
Writers from the Russian Empire
Revolutionaries from the Russian Empire
Russian people of World War I
White movement people
Prisoners who died in Soviet detention
Deaths by defenestration